BEEEEEEST is the final compilation album from the Japanese rock band HIGH and MIGHTY COLOR to feature Mākii, the lead female vocalist of the group.

Overview
BEEEEEEST is the second "Best" album from the band, coming less than a year after their previous compilation album. The track list for the album was specifically chosen by fans through online voting. The album contains the a special DVD with the PVs for Amazing, Flashback, HOT LIMIT, and Remember, previously uncollected PVs. It will also feature the final concert to be held with Mākii in its entirety.

Track listing
 OVER ~LIVE@OKINAWA MUSIC TOWN~
 Ichirin no Hana
 Dive into Yourself
 PRIDE
 Energy
 Here I Am
 Oxalis
 Remember
 Enrai (Tooku ni Aru Akari)
 NOTICE
 Humming bird
 Amazing
 Mirror
 For Dear...
 TOXIC

Personnel 

 Makii - vocals
 Yūsuke - vocals
 Kazuto - lead guitar
 Meg – rhythm guitar
 Mackaz) – bass
 Sassy – drums

Charts

References 

2008 greatest hits albums